The 1986 Melbourne Cup was a two-mile handicap horse race which took place on Tuesday, 5 November 1986.

The 1986 Melbourne Cup was won by At Talaq who was bought by Sheik Hamdan bin Rashid Al Maktoum for $800,000 and was sent to England to be trained by Harry Thomson Jones. He raced successfully and won the Grand Prix de Paris at Longchamp Racecourse before going to Australia to be trained by Colin Hayes. In his six-year-old season he won the Mackinnon Stakes before his victory in Melbourne Cup both times the son of Robeto was ridden by Michael Clarke. 1983 winner Kiwi was fourth and 1988 winner Empire Rose was fifth and the 1984 winner Black Knight finished down the order.

Field 

This is a list of horses which ran in the 1986 Melbourne Cup.

References

1986
Melbourne Cup
Melbourne Cup
1980s in Melbourne